WGL Holdings, Inc., is a public utility holding company that serves more than 1 million customers in the District of Columbia, Maryland, and Virginia. A subsidiary of AltaGas, it provides natural gas, electricity, sustainable energy, carbon neutrality and energy services, and also is engaged in natural gas exploration, production, and storage. The company operates four divisions: Washington Gas, WGL Energy, WGL Midstream, and Hampshire Gas.

The company dates to 1848. Today, 19th-century traces of the company include the Civil War-era aqueduct across Rock Creek Park between Georgetown and Foggy Bottom and the gas and electric street lamps installed nearby.

History

Genesis
Washington, D.C., was decades slower than some other eastern U.S. cities to move from candles or oil to natural gas for lighting. Baltimore was first, in 1816; New York City was partially lighted with gas in 1825. In 1840, when a gas company for Washington remained only a proposal, a U.S. Senate document argued for gas' salutary effect on the local economy: "fancy and other stores would introduce this light, and thus add to the cheerfulness of the public ways."

Among the early proponents of gas was James Crutchett, who bought a house north of the Capitol grounds and lit it with gas. This drew the attention of Congress, which voted him $17,500 to light up the Capitol and helped encourage public support for wider use of gas.

A supporter of Crutchett's ideas was Benjamin B. French, Chief Clerk of the House of Representatives, who helped attract other important supporters, including William A. Bradley, the city's postmaster and mayor; John F. Callan, a druggist; his brother Michael P. Callan, a Post Office clerk; hardware merchant William H. Harrover; William H. English, a Treasury clerk who became a Congressman from Indiana and later a Vice-Presidential candidate; and Jacob Bigelow, an attorney and abolitionist who later helped escaped slave Ann Maria Weems.

Two petitions were sent to Congress in April 1848, and on July 8 of that year, lawmakers issued the first Congressional charter for a company that would extract gas from coal. At last, the nation's capital had its first gas company, the Washington Gas Light Company. The company was established on the tenth street of the Foggy Bottom neighborhood, and eventually led to the area's urbanization.

1850-1900
George Washington Riggs became the president of the company in 1856. Two years later, the company began to build a new, more efficient factory, the West Station Works, between 26th and G Streets NW.

Meanwhile, a new plant was constructed in Foggy Bottom in 1858 at the intersection of New Hampshire and Virginia avenues NW. This location, at the head of the Chesapeake and Ohio Canal, gave it access to barges carrying coal from West Virginia and Pennsylvania.

These plants changed the neighborhood. Between 1830 and 1860, the percentage of "skilled laborers" in the Foggy Bottom neighborhood declined from 44% to 23%, while the percentage of "unskilled laborers" rose to 44%.

During the American Civil War, coal and transportation grew scarce. "The cost of making gas increased one hundred and twenty-five percent, and another problem appeared when Congress reduced the gas rate seventeen percent." The company sought help from the Secretary of War and from President Abraham Lincoln, who he wrote to John W. Garrett, president of the Baltimore and Ohio Railroad, asking him to "bring coal to the city and afford the continuation of the necessary gas lighting." Production levels for gas went down during the Civil War, they soon returned to normal.

In the 1870s, several large holding tanks (gasometers) were erected at the Foggy Bottom site.

In 1878, Thomas Edison introduced the incandescent lamp, a threat to the company.

In 1891, one of the gasometers exploded; the cause was attributed to a large storm.

20th century
Gas furnaces began to appear in 1915.

In 1947, the gas industry expanded to nearly 22 million customers nationwide.

The Foggy Bottom plant operated until the 1950s. In 1964, the Washington Gas Light Company sold development rights for the location in a deal that stipulated that the new structure would be supplied exclusively by the company. The site became home to the Watergate Complex, and the last building on the site was completed in 1971.

In 1997, in response to newly deregulated gas and energy markets, Washington Gas formed Washington Gas Resources Corp to serve as a holding company for non-utility subsidiaries.  Also in 1997, the company created an unregulated energy company, Washington Gas Energy Services, as a subsidiary of that holding company.

2000s 
In 2014, the company rebranded itself as WGL, aiming to project the image of "a new kind of energy company: answer-oriented, technology and data driven, responsive and built for the complex energy markets of today and tomorrow".

On July 6, 2018, the company was acquired by AltaGas. After the deal was closed, CEO and Chairman Terry McCallister retired from WGL and COO Adrian Chapman took the position. The AltaGas/Washington Gas merger agreement approved by the DC Public Service Commission required the company to develop a plan to comply with DC's commitment of carbon neutrality by 2050. On March 16, 2020, Washington Gas released its "Climate Business Plan," which calls for continued combustion of fossil fuels while adding some non-fossil fuel gases from sources like animal manure. In filings before the DC Public Service Commission, the DC Department of Energy and Environment and the DC Office of Attorney General said the plan, which calls for continued burning of fossil fuels past 2050, is "incompatible with the District's climate policy." In 2022, Washington Gas lobbied the DC Council to significantly weaken legislation to transition DC buildings from gas to clean energy, but the utility's effort was not successful.

References

External links

WGL Holdings
Washington Gas

Companies based in Washington, D.C.
Natural gas companies of the United States
Companies established in 1848